Viktor Vladislavovich Zubarev (born 31 March 1973, Uzhur, Uzhursky District) is a Russian political figure and a deputy of the 5th, 6th, 7th, and 8th State Dumas.
 
From 1984 to 1987, Zubarev worked as an engineer at the Institute of Chemistry and Chemical Technology of the Siberian Branch of the Academy of Sciences of the Soviet Union. In 1987-1990, he served as the chief engineer at the sector of modelling of mining processes at the Institute of Mining. At the end of the 1980s, he engaged in business. In 1996, he became the deputy of the Krasnoyarsk city council of deputies. From 1997 to 2007, he was the deputy of the Legislative Assembly of Krasnoyarsk Krai. On December 2, 2007, Zubarev was elected deputy of the 5th State Duma. From 2011 to 2012, he was the deputy of the Legislative Assembly of Krasnoyarsk Krai. From 2012 to 2014, he was the deputy of the 6th State Duma; however, later, he resigned early. From 2016 to 2021, he was the deputy of the 7th State Duma. Since September 2021, he has served as deputy of the 8th State Duma.

References
 

 

1973 births
Living people
United Russia politicians
21st-century Russian politicians
Eighth convocation members of the State Duma (Russian Federation)
Seventh convocation members of the State Duma (Russian Federation)
Sixth convocation members of the State Duma (Russian Federation)
Fifth convocation members of the State Duma (Russian Federation)
People from Krasnoyarsk Krai